Zhu Jie (born 30 January 1978) is a Chinese handball player who competed in the 2008 Summer Olympics. He was born in Huainan.

References

1978 births
Living people
Chinese male handball players
Olympic handball players of China
Handball players at the 2008 Summer Olympics
Sportspeople from Anhui
People from Huainan
Handball players at the 2002 Asian Games
Asian Games competitors for China